Dendrophilus is a genus of clown beetles in the family Histeridae. There are about 10 described species in Dendrophilus.

Species
These 10 species belong to the genus Dendrophilus:
 Dendrophilus californicus Horn, 1892
 Dendrophilus kiteleyi Bousquet & Laplante, 1999
 Dendrophilus opacus Ross, 1940
 Dendrophilus proditor (Reichardt, 1925)
 Dendrophilus punctatus (Herbst, 1791)
 Dendrophilus pygmaeus (Linnaeus, 1758)
 Dendrophilus sulcatus Motschulsky, 1845
 Dendrophilus tubercularis Lackner, 2005
 Dendrophilus tularensis Ross, 1937
 Dendrophilus xavieri Marseul, 1873

References

Further reading

External links

 

Histeridae
Articles created by Qbugbot